Frederick Osborn (10 November 1889 – 11 October 1954) was an English cricketer and footballer.

Cricket
Osborn made two first-class appearances for Leicestershire. His first appearance came against Derbyshire in the 1911 County Championship at Aylestone Road, Leicester, while his second came against Lancashire in the 1913 County Championship at Old Trafford. Against Derbyshire, he made scores of 14 in Leicestershire's first-innings, during which he was dismissed by Arnold Warren, while in their second-innings he wasn't required to bat. Against Lancashire, Osborn was dismissed for a duck by Bill Huddleston in Leicestershire's first-innings, while in their second-innings he was dismissed for the same score by Ralph Whitehead.

Football

Osborn played as a forward in the Football League for Leicester Fosse and Preston North End.

After being switched from inside forward to centre forward, Osborn was top scorer for Preston in 1913–14 with 26 goals, although the club was still relegated and again the following season with 17 goals as they won promotion back to the First Division, before league football was interrupted by the First World War.

Wounded during the war, Osborn was unable to regain a regular place in the Preston team when the league resumed in 1919, appearing only seven more times for the club.

Personal life 
Osborn served in the Royal Field Artillery during the First World War and was wounded by a bullet in the thigh.

References

External links
Frederick Osborn at ESPNcricinfo
Frederick Osborn at CricketArchive

1889 births
1954 deaths
Military personnel from Leicester
Footballers from Leicester
English cricketers
Leicestershire cricketers
English footballers
Preston North End F.C. players
Leicester City F.C. players
Association football forwards
Association football inside forwards
English Football League players
Hinckley United F.C. players
Nuneaton Borough F.C. players
British Army personnel of World War I
Royal Field Artillery soldiers
Cricketers from Leicester